Sudol may refer to:

Places in Poland
Sudoł, Lubusz Voivodeship
Sudół, Jędrzejów County, Świętokrzyskie Voivodeship
Sudół, Ostrowiec County, Świętokrzyskie Voivodeship
Sudół, Pińczów County, Świętokrzyskie Voivodeship

Other uses
Sudol (surname), a surname

See also